Carlin's Amoco Station is a historic Amoco service station located at Roanoke, Virginia.  It was built about 1947, and remodeled about 1953 in the Streamline Moderne style.  The one-story gas station is constructed of concrete block covered with stucco and sits on a concrete slab foundation.  Also on the property is an associated repair shop constructed about 1947.

Built on Williamson Road in Roanoke, the gas station was a scene of viewing muscle car drag racing and cruising by local teenagers in the post-war years between 1947 and 1962.

The building was listed on the National Register of Historic Places in 2012.

References

Moderne architecture in Virginia
Commercial buildings completed in 1947
Buildings and structures in Roanoke, Virginia
National Register of Historic Places in Roanoke, Virginia
Gas stations on the National Register of Historic Places in Virginia
Amoco